Line 4 of the Athens Metro is a future line that will run from Alsos Veikou to Goudi. Construction of the line started in mid to late-2021 and is scheduled to be completed in 2029 or 2030.

Line 4 had been under consideration for many years. Its exact route was changed multiple times. However, the route from Alsos Veikou to Goudi was chosen, as it has the benefit of being the one passing from the densely populated areas of central Athens, like Galatsi, Exarheia, Kolonaki, Kaisariani and Zografou.

In the distant future, it will be extended further north to Ethniki Odos and to other important suburbs of Athens, like Marousi.

Development history

Plans for Line 4 of the Athens originated from the Metro Development Study for the period between 1996–2000, which proposed branch lines for Lines 2 and 3.

On 1 December 2005, Georgios Souflias, then the Minister of the Environment, Urban Planning and Public Works, announced that the two branches would combine to form the U-shaped Line 4. Souflias stated that the original branches, if built, would have caused "significant structural and operational weaknesses" for Lines 2 and 3. The original proposal for Line 4 is similar to what is currently proposed between Alsos Veikou and Marousi (without the Line 5 branch), but it did not include stations at Elikonos, Panepistimioupoli, and OTE.

Controversies 

There has been significant opposition to a metro station at Exarcheia Square, in a neighbourhood known for radical political and intellectual activism.

Future extensions

In March 2017, Attiko Metro (the infrastructure manager of the Athens Metro) split the implementation of Line 4 into five phases, of which Phase A is now under construction: proposals for Phases 3, 4 and 5 first appeared in the Souflias plan in April 2009.

Phase 2 

Phase 3 

Attiko Metro also announced the possibility of a further extension from Dafni towards Kalamaki.

Phase 4 

Phase 4 may consist of a  line from Alsos Veikou to Petroupoli, with intermediate stations at Plateia Igias in Nea Ionia,  (for Line 1), Nea Filadelfeia,  (for Suburban Railway trains), and Ilion (for Line 2). However, the September 2022 Athens Metro Development Plan reroutes Line 4 via  instead of Perissos, resulting in the relocation of the station for Nea Filadelfeia.

Phase 5 

However, the September 2022 Athens Metro Development Plan omits the station at National Road.

Stations

The spelling of the station names on this table, in English and Greek, are according to Attiko Metro. All confirmed stations are underground, and have a layout of two tracks and two side platforms.

Notes

References

External links
Athens Metro official website

Athens Metro lines